Bernard Chunga is a Kenyan lawyer and a former Chief Justice of Kenya. Justice Chunga resigned from the office on 26 February 2003 paving the way for the appointment of Justice Johnson Evans Gicheru.

Early career
Justice Chunga previously worked as Deputy Public Prosecutor. As Deputy Public Prosecutor, he was the lead counsel in the commission of Inquiry into Robert Ouko’s death which was led by Justice Evans Gicheru. He was also the prosecutor at the trial of Jonah Anguka, a former DC implicated in Ouko murder.

Tribunal and Resignation

Rather than facing a tribunal established by the newly elected President Mwai Kibaki to investigate alleged misconduct, Justice Chunga resigned.

See also
 Chief Justice of Kenya
 Court of Appeal of Kenya
 High Court of Kenya

References

Living people
20th-century Kenyan judges
21st-century Kenyan judges
Chief justices of Kenya
1949 births